Patrick Craig MacLarnon (born 24 September 1963) is an English former first-class cricketer and educator.

MacLarnon was born at Nottingham in September 1963. He was educated at Loughborough Grammar School, before going up to St Peter's College, Oxford. While studying at Oxford, he played first-class cricket for Oxford University in 1985 and 1986, making eleven appearances. MacLarnon scored 177 runs in his eleven matches, at an average of 13.61 and a high score of 56. With his right-arm medium pace bowling, he took 3 wickets from 87 overs bowled.

After graduating from Oxford, MacLarnon became a schoolteacher. He is a former headmaster of Milbourne Lodge School.

References

External links

1963 births
Living people
Cricketers from Nottingham
People educated at Loughborough Grammar School
Alumni of St Peter's College, Oxford
English cricketers
Oxford University cricketers
Schoolteachers from Surrey
Heads of schools in England